Francis Baring, 3rd Baron Ashburton (20 May 1800 – 6 September 1868) was a British peer Whig and later Tory politician.

Early life
He was born in Philadelphia, United States, the second son of Alexander Baring and Ann Louisa, the daughter and coheiress of the wealthy William Bingham of Blackpoint, Philadelphia, a US Senator. He was the younger brother of Bingham Baring. Francis was educated privately and at Geneva and in 1817 joined Baring Brothers, the family bank. After successfully travelling on business to North America and the West Indies he was made a quarter share partner in the bank in 1823.

However, after unfortunate financial speculations in Mexican land and in the French sugar market, he was demoted to a non-executive director in 1828 and in 1830 was given his brother's Parliamentary seat for Thetford.

Political career
He was elected at the 1830 general election as a Whig Member of Parliament (MP) for the borough of Thetford in Norfolk,
and held the seat until the 1831 election, which he did not contest. He was re-elected in 1832 as a Tory, and held the seat as a Conservative until the 1841 general election, which he did not contest.

He was returned again for Thetford at a by-election in August 1848, and held the seat until his resignation through appointment as Steward of the Chiltern Hundreds on 30 November 1857.

Baring succeeded to the barony in 1864 on the death of his brother, Bingham Baring, becoming the 3rd Baron Ashburton.

Slave holder
According to the Legacies of British Slave-Ownership at the University College London, Baring was awarded compensation in the aftermath of the Slavery Abolition Act 1833 with the Slave Compensation Act 1837.

Baring was associated with eight different claims, he owned 1079 slaves in British Guiana and received approximately £56,000 in compensation.

Family
He married in 1832 Claire Hortense (c. 1812 – 1882), a daughter of Hugues-Bernard Maret, duc de Bassano, and moved to live in Paris. He was the father of Alexander Baring, 4th Baron Ashburton, and Marie Anne Louise Baring (wife of William FitzRoy, 6th Duke of Grafton).

Legacy
The town of Ashburton, New Zealand, is named for Francis Baring, who was a member of the Canterbury Association.

References

External links
 

1800 births
1868 deaths
British bankers
Whig (British political party) MPs for English constituencies
Tory MPs (pre-1834)
Conservative Party (UK) MPs for English constituencies
UK MPs 1830–1831
UK MPs 1832–1835
UK MPs 1835–1837
UK MPs 1837–1841
UK MPs 1847–1852
UK MPs 1852–1857
Ashburton, B3
Francis
British people of American descent
Ashburton, New Zealand
Francis 3
Younger sons of barons
Recipients of payments from the Slavery Abolition Act 1833
British slave owners
19th-century British businesspeople